The Arboretum Curie, also known as the Arboretum du Col des Trois Soeurs, is a small arboretum located at 1470 metres altitude in the Col des Trois Soeurs near La Panouse, Lozère, Languedoc-Roussillon, France. It was created circa 1975 to study conifers suitable for reforestation, and according to Arbez et al., now contains 77 taxa (primarily conifers).

See also 
 Arboretum de Born
 List of botanical gardens in France

References 
 Michel Arbez et al., Les Ressources génétiques forestières en France, Bureau des ressources génétiques, Institut national de la recherche agronomique (France), Editions Quae, 1987, pages 29–30. 

Curie, Arboretum
Curie, Arboretum